The Wheel is a 2021 American romantic drama film directed by Steve Pink, starring Amber Midthunder, Taylor Gray, Bethany Anne Lind, and Nelson Lee.

Cast
 Amber Midthunder as Albee
 Taylor Gray as Walker
 Bethany Anne Lind as Carly
 Nelson Lee as Ben
 Carly Nykanen as Joan
 Kevin Pasdon as Aaron

Release
The film premiered at the 2021 Toronto International Film Festival on September 13, 2021. The film was released in the United States on July 22, 2022.

Reception
On review aggregation website Rotten Tomatoes, the film has an approval rating of 91% based on 32 reviews. The website's critical consensus reads, "Beautifully filmed and brought to life by a quartet of fine performances, The Wheel spins a quietly moving story about love and relationships." Richard Roeper of the Chicago Sun-Times rated the film 3 stars out of 4, writing that "The four main players are all excellent, with Amber Midthunder delivering particularly outstanding work that shows she is a young actor capable of great things." Nicolas Rapold of The New York Times wrote a positive review of the film, writing that "The story ends with an ambitiously staged sequence that reaches for another level of feeling, but it’s hard for anything to match the bruising depiction of Albee and Walker’s rough road to that point."

Angie Han of The Hollywood Reporter wrote that while the film may not "reinvent the wheel", it "delivers something that nevertheless feels new and surprising". Paul Risker pf PopMatters gave the film a rating of 7 out of 10, writing that "Scars and wounds are scratched at in The Wheel. As uncomfortable as that is, the power of cinema is to tell a story that’s as much about the audience as it is about the characters." Matt Goldberg of Collider gave the film a rating of B, writing that it is "somber, melancholic, sad, sweet, and emotionally jagged in the best way possible." Mae Abdulbaki of Screen Rant rated the film 3 stars out of 5, writing that "in letting the main couple understand, acknowledge, and sit in their feelings — be they hurt, anger, frustration, or loneliness — is when the film is at its best."

Peter Debruge of Variety praised the performances while criticizing Pink's direction, writing that he "shows almost no intuition for how to block or shoot a scene". Noel Murray of the Los Angeles Times wrote a mixed review of the film, writing that "for all its formulaic faults, “The Wheel” is unusually astute about the ways some couples avoid the hard truths about each other because they’re afraid of ripping their whole lives apart."

References

External links
 
 

American romantic drama films
2021 romantic drama films